2006 Halemba Coal Mine disaster refers to the accident of 21 November 2006 in the Halemba Coal Mine, Ruda Śląska, Poland. An explosion of methane and coal dust resulted in 23 fatalities. It was one of the largest mining disasters in Poland. The government declared three days of national mourning.

References

2006 mining disasters
2006 in the environment
2006 in Poland
Mining disasters in Poland 
Coal mining disasters in Poland
2006 disasters in Poland
Ruda Śląska